Ganascus is a genus of ant-like leaf beetles in the family Aderidae. There are at least two described species in Ganascus.

Species
These two species belong to the genus Ganascus:
 Ganascus ptinoides (Schwarz, 1878)
 Ganascus ventricosus (LeConte, 1875)

References

Further reading

 
 
 

Aderidae
Articles created by Qbugbot